Friedrich Max Kircheisen (23 June 1877 – 12 February 1933) was a German historian, born at Chemnitz. He studied history and international law at the Universities of Leipzig and Paris and specialized in the Napoleonic era.

Works
 Bibliography of Napoleon (1902) – A systematic collection critically selected
 Memoires Of Napoleon I (1927) – Compiled from his own writings       
 Napoleon (1932) – Translation of Napoleon I: ein Lebensbild  
 Die Schriften von und über Friedrich von Gentz (1906) – The writings of and about Friedrich von Gentz.
 Napoleon: Auswahl aus Seinen Aussprüchen (1907) – Napoleon, selection of his sayings.  
 Hat Napoleon Gelebt? Und andere kuriose Geschichten (1910). 
 Napoleon, Sein Leben und Seine Zeit (1914) – Napoleon, his life and times.
 Napoleon im Lande der Pyramiden (1918) – Napoleon in the land of the pyramids.
 Auswahl aus J. J. Rousseau Briefen 1908) – Selection of Jean-Jacques Rousseau's letters.
 Memoiren aus dem Spanischen Freiheitskampfe (1908) – Memoirs of the Spanish struggle for freedom 1808–1811.
 Gedichte (1913) – Poetry; edition of Max von Schenkendorf.
 Die Schlacht an der Marne (1915) – The Battle of the Marne.

References

Notes

 

German biographers
Male biographers
Kircheisen, Friedrich, Max
1933 deaths
People from Chemnitz
German male non-fiction writers